Park Sung-hoon (born December 8, 2002), known mononymously as Sunghoon, is a South Korean singer, former presenter and  figure skater. He competed as a figure skater from 2010 to early 2020; while simultaneously being a Bighit Music trainee since 2018, later transferring to Belift Lab. He retired from the sport and debuted as a member of the South Korean boy band Enhypen in November 2020. Sunghoon is the 2016, 2017 junior silver medalist and the 2015 novice gold medalist of Asian Figure Skating Trophy, and the 2015 novice gold medalist of Lombardia Trophy. He also won silver medals at the 2013 novice competition and the 2014 junior competition of South Korean Figure Skating Championships.

Career

2010–2019: Figure skating 
Sunghoon won two international advanced novice competitions, Asian Figure Skating Trophy and Lombardia Trophy, during the 2015-16 figure skating season.

Sunghoon made his international junior debut during the 2016-17 figure skating season when he became age-eligible. He earned a silver medal at Asian Figure Skating Trophy, and participated in ISU Junior Grand Prix in Estonia as a representative of South Korea. The next year, he won another silver medal at Asian Figure Skating Trophy, and participated in ISU Junior Grand Prix in Poland.

During the 2018-19 figure skating season, Sunghoon became age-eligible for senior competitions. He participated in two ISU Challenger Series events, Asian Figure Skating Trophy and Alpen Trophy.

2020–present: Debut with Enhypen and hosting 

In 2018, Sunghoon became a trainee at Big Hit Music after being scouted while figure skating. On June 1, 2020, he was announced as a participant in the survival show I-Land, a competition survival show produced by Mnet and Belift Lab, a joint venture between CJ E&M and Hybe Corporation. As one of seven successful finalists, he placed sixth and was selected to join the newly formed South Korean idol group Enhypen. Sunghoon made his official debut with the group on November 30, 2020, with the album Border: Day One.

In September 2021, Sunghoon was announced as the new host for Korean television program Music Bank with Wonyoung of IVE. The pair, dubbed as "장꾸" (Jangkku), first appeared on air together on October 8, 2021.

On July 27, 2022, Sunghoon made a special appearance in Playlist's web series Mimicus as himself.

Programs

Competitive highlights
CS: Challenger Series; JGP: ISU Junior Grand Prix

Detailed results

 Personal best highlighted in bold.

Personal life
Sunghoon graduated from Pangok High School in 2021.

Health
On September 2, 2021, Belift revealed through Weverse that Sunghoon, along with fellow members Heeseung, Jay, Jake, and Jungwon tested positive for COVID-19. Sunghoon began showing symptoms on August 30. On September 12, 2021, Sunghoon announced through Weverse that he had been discharged from the treatment facility after being healed.

On February 2, 2022, Belift revealed through Weverse that Sunghoon underwent surgery on January 29 to alleviate his symptoms of rhinitis, which included discomfort while singing and in his daily life.

Discography

Filmography

Web series

Television shows

Hosting

Web shows

Awards and nominations

References

Further reading

External links
 
 

Enhypen
South Korean male single skaters
2002 births
Living people
Singers from Seoul
South Korean male idols
Hybe Corporation artists
21st-century South Korean male singers
Japanese-language singers of South Korea